Neil Masnic (born 10 May 2000) is a German-Georgian basketball player who plays for BAL of the BNXT League.

Career
In the 2019–20 season, Masnic played for EWE Baskets Juniors in the ProB.

On 15 June 2020, Masnic signed a 2-year contract with BAL in the Netherlands. On 2 May 2021, he won the 2021 DBL Cup with his team after beating Yoast United in the final.

References

External links
Eurobasket profile

2000 births
Living people
Basketball Academie Limburg players
EWE Baskets Juniors players
German men's basketball players
Men's basketball players from Georgia (country)
Small forwards